E Corp Studio (also known as E Corp) is a Mexican production company founded by director, writer and producer Erik Mariñelarena. The name E Corp Studio derives from  "entertainment".

History
Since 2008, E Corp Studio partnered with many production companies to produce a new generation of Mexican films.

Filmography

References

External links

Film production companies of Mexico